Abdul Wadud (born Ronald Earsall DeVaughn; April 30, 1947 – August 10, 2022) was an American cellist known for his work in jazz and classical settings. Jazz musician and fellow composer Tomeka Reid hailed Abdul Wadud's "Camille" in a 2020 feature in the New York Times on music that one could play to make friends fall in love with the cello.

His son is the R&B singer Raheem DeVaughn.

Wadud died on August 10, 2022, at the age of 75.

Discography

As leader
1977: By Myself  Bishara
1976: Live In New York (with Julius Hemphill)
1979: Straight Ahead/Free At Last (with Leroy Jenkins)  Red
1984: I've Known Rivers (with James Newton & Anthony Davis)  Gramavision
1986: Black Swan Quartet (with Akbar Ali, Eileen Folson & Reggie Workman) Minor Music
1990: Trio^2 (with James Newton & Anthony Davis) Gramavision
1993: Oakland Duets (with Julius Hemphill)  Music & Arts

As sideman
Black Unity Trio – Al-Fatihah (1971) Salaam 
Frank Lowe – Fresh (1974) Black Lion
George Lewis – Shadowgraph 5 (1977) Black Saint
Charles "Bobo" Shaw – The Streets of St. Louis (1977)
Oliver Lake – Shine! (1978)
Michael Franks – Tiger In The Rain (1979) Warner Brothers
Muhal Richard Abrams – Rejoicing with the Light (Black Saint, 1983)
David Murray – The People's Choice (1988) Columbia
Marty Ehrlich Dark Woods Ensemble – Emergency Peace (1991) New World
With James Newton
Paseo Del Mar (1978)
Portraits (1982)
Romance And Revolution (1986)
With Julius Hemphill
Dogon A.D. (1972) Mbari
 Coon Bid'ness (1975) Mbari
 Raw Materials and Residuals (Black Saint, 1977)
 Flat-Out Jump Suite (Black Saint, 1980)
 Live From The New Music Cafe (1991) Music & Arts
With Arthur Blythe
 Light Blue: Arthur Blythe Plays Thelonious Monk (1983) Columbia
 Illusions (1980) Columbia
 The Grip (1977) India Navigation
Metamorphosis (1977) India Navigation
With Anthony Davis
Of Blues And Dreams (1978) Sackville
Epistemes (1981)
Undines (1986)

References

External links
 
 
 
 
 
Obituary from National Public Radio
Obituary from JazzTimes

1947 births
2022 deaths
African-American classical composers
American classical composers
African-American jazz composers
American jazz composers
African-American male classical composers
American male classical composers
American classical cellists
American jazz cellists
American male jazz musicians
American Muslims
Classical musicians from Ohio
Human Arts Ensemble members
Jazz musicians from Ohio
Free jazz musicians
Musicians from Cleveland
21st-century African-American people
20th-century African-American people